Montenegro competed at the 2017 World Games held in Wrocław, Poland.

Medalists

Ju-jitsu 

Dejan Vukčević won the bronze medal in the men's fighting +94 kg event.

Karate 

Marina Raković competed in the women's kumite 68 kg event.

References 

Nations at the 2017 World Games
2017 in Montenegrin sport
Montenegro at multi-sport events